The Treasure is a Hong Kong-Chinese comedy period adventure film directed by Ronald Cheng and Gordon Chan and starring Ronald Cheng, Dayo Wong, Fala Chen and Sharon Hsu. To date, the film is still unreleased.

Cast
Ronald Cheng
Dayo Wong
Fala Chen
Sharon Hsu
Sam Lee
Michael Wong

References

External links

2017 films
2010s adventure comedy films
Chinese adventure comedy films
Films directed by Gordon Chan
Polybona Films films
Chinese 3D films
2017 comedy films